Marie-Louise Dubreil-Jacotin (7 July 1905 – 19 October 1972) was a French mathematician, the second woman to obtain a doctorate in pure mathematics in France, the first woman to become a full professor of mathematics in France, the president of the French Mathematical Society, and an expert on fluid mechanics and abstract algebra.

Early life and education
Marie-Louise Jacotin was the daughter of a lawyer for a French bank, and the grand-daughter (through her mother) of a glassblower from a family of Greek origin. Her mathematics teacher at the lycée was a sister of mathematician Élie Cartan, and after passing the baccalaureate she was allowed (through the intervention of a friend's father, the head of the institution) to continue studying mathematics at the Collège de Chaptal. On her second attempt, she placed second in the entrance examination for the École Normale Supérieure in 1926 (tied with Claude Chevalley), but by a ministerial decree was moved down to 21st position. After the intervention of Fernand Hauser, the editor of the Journal of the ENS, she was admitted to the school. Her teachers there included Henri Lebesgue and Jacques Hadamard, and she finished her studies in 1929.

With the encouragement of ENS director Ernest Vessiot she traveled to Oslo to work with Vilhelm Bjerknes, under whose influence she became interested in the mathematics of waves and the work of Tullio Levi-Civita in this subject. She returned to Paris in 1930, married another mathematician, Paul Dubreil, and joined him on another tour of the mathematics centers of Germany and Italy, including a visit with Levi-Civita. The Dubreils returned to France again in 1931.

Career and research

While her husband taught at Lille, Dubreil-Jacotin continued her research, finishing a doctorate in 1934 concerning the existence of infinitely many different waves in ideal liquids, under the supervision of Henri Villat. Before her, the only women to obtain doctorates in mathematics in France were Marie Charpentier in 1931 (also in pure mathematics) and Edmée Chandon in 1930 (in astronomy and geodesy).

Following her husband, she moved to Nancy, but was unable to obtain a faculty position there herself because that was viewed as nepotism; instead, she became a research assistant at the University of Rennes. She was promoted to a teaching position in 1938, and became an assistant professor at the University of Lyon in 1939, while also continuing to teach at Rennes. In 1943 she became a full professor at the University of Poitiers, the first woman to become a full professor of mathematics in France, and in 1955 she was given a chair there in differential and integral calculus. In 1956 she moved to the University of Paris and after the university split she held a professorship at Pierre and Marie Curie University.

In the 1950s, motivated by the study of averaging operators for turbulence, Dubreil-Jacotin's interests turned towards abstract algebra, and she later performed research in semigroups and graded algebraic structures. She was the author of two textbooks, one on lattice theory and the other on abstract algebra. As well as her technical publications, Jacotin was the author of a work in the history of mathematics, Portraits of women mathematicians. She was president of the French Mathematical Society for 1952.

Legacy
Rue Marie-Louise-Dubreil-Jacotin, a street in the 13th arrondissement of Paris within Paris Diderot University, is named after her, and the University of Poitiers also has a street with the same name. In semigroup theory, the Dubreil-Jacotin semigroups are also named after her, as is the Dubreil-Jacotin–Long equation, "the standard model for internal gravity waves" in fluid mechanics.

References

External links

Marie-Louise Dubreil-Jacotin, from Annuaire des Anciens Élèves de l'École Normale Supérieure (1974)

1905 births
1972 deaths
20th-century French mathematicians
20th-century French women
20th-century women mathematicians
Academic staff of the University of Lyon
Academic staff of the University of Poitiers
Algebraists
École Normale Supérieure alumni
French people of Greek descent
French women mathematicians
Textbook writers
Academic staff of the University of Paris
Women textbook writers